CK Birla Group, is an Indian multinational conglomerate named after Chandra Kant Birla, headquartered in the Birla Tower in Barakhamba road, New Delhi, India. Earlier the group was led by industrialists - BM Birla and GD Birla (Padma Vibhushan). The Group includes brands such as Orient Electric, Orient Cement, NBC Bearings, Aerocon, and Birla Institute of Technology, Mesra.

As of 2021, it includes over 25,000 employees, 41 manufacturing facilities, and operations across five continents. The CK Birla group is a diversified conglomerate with total revenue of approximately US$2.4 billion in the year 2021. Its current chairman CK Birla is a member of the Birla family. The CK Birla Group operates in three different industries, technology and automotive, home and building, and healthcare and education.

Notable companies
HIL Limited
National Engineering Industries Limited
Orient Electric Limited
 Orient Paper & Industries Limited
GMMCO Limited
Orient cement Ltd.
CK Birla Hospitals
Birla Fertility & IVF
Birlasoft

Notable charitable trusts

Birla Institute of Applied Sciences, Uttarakhand
Birla Institute of Scientific Research, Jaipur
BIT Mesra , Ranchi
Modern High School for Girls, Kolkata

References

 
Companies based in New Delhi
Manufacturing companies established in 1857
1857 establishments in British India
Indian companies established in 1857